Taala Te Kunjee is a 2017 feature documentary written and directed by Shilpi Gulati that follows the journey of four former drug addicts and alcoholics from Amritsar, Punjab who are helping families recover from the rampant drug problem in the state. It was produced by JPS Bhatia. In 2019, the film was awarded the National Film Awards for Best Film on Social Issues and a cash prize of Rs. 50,000.

People featured 

 Jasbir Singh
 Tejinder Walia
 Gurpratap Singh

Reception 
Tarun Kumar of Firstpost states, "Taala Te Kunjee is an interesting portrayal of the process of recovery through the lives and stories of five men who are not only at varying stages in their own lives, but also at different stages of recovery."

Awards

References

External links 

 

2017 documentary films
National Film Award (India) winners
Punjabi-language Indian films
Indian documentary films